The Żuk (pl. beetle) was a van and light truck produced in Lublin, Poland, between 1958 and 1998 by FSC. It was based on FSO Warszawa, which in turn was licensed from the Soviet passenger car GAZ-M20 Pobeda. The chassis, suspension and engine from FSO Warszawa formed the basis of the Żuk and the Nysa light vans designed in the late 1950s. About  were manufactured.

The Żuk was mainly sold to state organizations, but also to individuals. After 1989, with the liberalization of the Polish economy, the Żuk was able to maintain sales to the traditional markets and expand the number sold to individual consumers. The final few years of production was in parallel to its successor, the Lublin van, as a cheaper alternative.

The Żuk came in a range of body styles. The most common were van and light 1.1-ton pickup truck. Rarer variants were minibus and a long-cab truck. Rare for a van, it had independent front suspension. It was very angular, with a number of wide channels running along the side of the body and a completely flat windscreen/windshield. After about ten years in production the front of the cab was restyled, from then on the distinctive side channels no longer continued around onto the front to meet the grille. No further changes were made, except a minor change to the number of vents located above the headlights.

The Żuk was a favourite of farmers, and a common place to find groups of them was at any local market when they were used to transport crops from the fields to the farmers’ own stalls. The Polish postal service (Poczta Polska) used large numbers of Żuks painted in a dull orange colour, and local fire services used them as personnel carriers or even as mini fire engines in country districts.

The Żuk was shipped to the Soviet Union in the panel van form. From 1970's to about 1990 it was also manufactured in Egypt under licence as ELTRAMCO RAMZES.

References

Vehicles of Poland
FSC vehicles
Science and technology in Poland